Gaurena watsoni is a moth in the family Drepanidae. It is found in the Chinese provinces of Sichuan and Yunnan and in Vietnam.

References

Moths described in 1966
Thyatirinae